Oscar Roberto Cornejo "Toto" Hernandez (born 13 March 1983 in Santa Rosa, La Pampa) is an Argentine footballer who plays for his hometown team Club Atlético Santa Rosa.

Career
Cornejo began his playing career with San Lorenzo de Almagro in 2001 where he won a number of championships with the team. After playing abroad he returned to Argentina in 2006 to play of Gimnasia y Esgrima de La Plata.

Since 2008 Cornejo has been playing in Chile with Cobreloa and then CD Everton.

He has also played for Dorados de Sinaloa of Mexico, Universitario de Deportes of Peru Deportivo Cali of Colombia.

On 28 July, Cornejo signed for New Zealand A-League franchise Wellington Phoenix F.C., after a successful trial and made his debut for the club as a second-half substitute in a 2-0 win over the Central Coast Mariners on 22 August 2010.

After the completion of the 2010–11 A-League season Cornejo returned home to Argentina and joined his local team Club Atlético Santa Rosa.

A-League career statistics

Honours
With San Lorenzo
Torneo Clausura: 2001
Copa Mercosur: 2001
Copa Sudamericana: 2002

References

External links
Wellington Phoenix Player Profile
 BDFA profile
 Argentine Primera statistics

1983 births
Living people
People from Santa Rosa, La Pampa
Argentine footballers
Argentine expatriate footballers
Association football midfielders
San Lorenzo de Almagro footballers
Club de Gimnasia y Esgrima La Plata footballers
Club Universitario de Deportes footballers
Cobreloa footballers
Dorados de Sinaloa footballers
Deportivo Cali footballers
Everton de Viña del Mar footballers
Wellington Phoenix FC players
A-League Men players
Liga MX players
Categoría Primera A players
Expatriate footballers in Peru
Expatriate footballers in Chile
Argentine expatriate sportspeople in Chile
Expatriate footballers in Colombia
Argentine expatriate sportspeople in Colombia
Expatriate association footballers in New Zealand
Argentine expatriate sportspeople in Peru